Saluta Rocks is a group of rocks 1 nautical mile (1.9 km) east of Laurie Point, lying off the south coast and near the west end of South Georgia. The name Mutt and Jeff was probably given by Lieutenant Commander J.M. Chaplin of the 1926. The SGS, 1955–56, reported that the name is misleading; there are not two rocks as implied, but a group. The rocks were renamed by the United Kingdom Antarctic Place-Names Committee (UK-APC) for the Saluta, a transport of the South Georgia Whaling Co. for many years.

Rock formations of Antarctica